Boninena callistoderma is a species of air-breathing land snail, a terrestrial pulmonate gastropod mollusk in the family Enidae.

This species is currently only endemic to Haha-jima and Ane-jima in the Ogasawara Islands (Japan), having been extirpated from other parts of this archipelago.

References

Enidae
Endemic fauna of Japan
Molluscs of Japan
Natural history of the Bonin Islands
Endangered animals
Endangered biota of Asia
Taxonomy articles created by Polbot